World in Motion 1 is the sixth studio album by Crack the Sky and the last to be released by the band's second incarnation. Three years later, a new configuration of Crack the Sky released Raw. The album was originally released on LP, and to date has not been released on CD. MP3s of it can be found on the internet, including at the band's official site.

Track listing

Note: The song "Needles and Pins" was first recorded by Jackie DeShannon in 1963. Better known is the version by The Searchers, recorded in 1963, released in January 1964.

Personnel

The band
John Palumbo – Lead vocals, guitar, computer
Vince DePaul – Synthesizer, piano
Bobby Hird – Lead guitar
John Tracey – Drums
Carey Ziegler – Bass guitar

Additional musicians
David Lewis – Man laughing
James (Beau) Reid – Original policeman
The German Children's Home – Children's choir ("When I Grow Up")
The Berman & Tracey children – Children's choir ("When I Grow Up")
The Hannah More School – Children's choir ("When I Grow Up")

Production
John Ariosa – Executive producer
Richard Van Horne – Assistant executive producer
John Palumbo – Producer
Victor Giordano – Engineer
Bob Ludwig – Mastering

Additional credits
Recorded and mixed at Sheffield Audio/Video Productions, Studio A, Phoenix, Maryland.
Mastered at Masterdisc
Vanessa Koolhof – Road crew
Lyle Weintzweig – Road crew
Rena of Monaco – Transportation
Jeffery Sharp – Protection
John Palumbo – Cover art
James Jones – Back cover photo
Special thanks: Mike Corkran, Bill Mueller, Gordon Miller Music, Edward S. Feldman & Bob Sellars for the custom guitars, Derek Sutton, Bob Goldstein (it's in the mail), Peter Sullivan, Elton, Marvin & Stevie, Don Wehner, Barton Kenney, Casey Dansicker, Nancy Scaggs, Jeff Miller (it's in the mail II), Walt Copeland, Randy, Paul, Jeep, and everyone at MSI

Sources
LP liner notes

External links
 Official site

1983 albums
Crack the Sky albums